Deniliquin Council was a local government area in the Riverina region of south-western New South Wales, Australia.  At the date of its abolition, Deniliquin Council was the last rural local government area in New South Wales left consisting only of a rural town.

Deniliquin Council was proclaimed as the Municipality of Deniliquin on 16 December 1868.

Amalgamation
On 12 March 2016, Deniliquin Council was abolished and, along with the former Conargo Shire, the area incorporated into the new Edward River Council.

Council

Composition and election method
The last election was due to be held on 8 September 2012. However, only seven candidates, being the below, nominated for election. There being no additional candidates, the election was uncontested. The makeup of the council is as follows:

The last Council, elected in 2012, in order of election, is:

References

Former local government areas of New South Wales
Deniliquin
1868 establishments in Australia
2016 disestablishments in Australia